Fox River is a census-designated place (CDP) in Kenai Peninsula Borough, Alaska, United States. At the 2010 census the population was 685, up from 616 in 2000. It was first reported by the U.S. Geological Survey in 1895. The Fox River, which flows by the CDP, might have been named for Theodore Fox, a local mining magnate.

Geography
Fox River is located on the western side of the Kenai Peninsula at  (59.847372, -150.926178). It is at the head of Kachemak Bay, where the Fox River enters it. The CDP extends north from the bay to high ground north of Caribou Lake. It is bordered to the southwest by Falls Creek, which separates the community from the Fritz Creek CDP. Most of the current population of Fox River is in the southwest part of the CDP, on high ground overlooking Falls Creek, Swift Creek, and Moose Creek.

The populated area is known locally as "The Head of the (Kachemak) Bay". Its population resides for the most part in the three Russian Old Believer villages of Voznesenka, Kachemak Selo, and Razdolna. Most of the remainder of the CDP is inside the Kenai National Wildlife Refuge and has no population.

Demographics

Fox River first appeared on the 1990 U.S. Census as a census-designated place (CDP).

As of the census of 2000, there were 616 people, 122 households, and 103 families residing in the CDP.  The population density was 4.9 people per square mile (1.9/km2).  There were 170 housing units at an average density of 1.3/sq mi (0.5/km2).  The racial makeup of the CDP was 99.68% White, 0.16% from other races, and 0.16% from two or more races.  0.16% of the population were Hispanic or Latino of any race.

There were 122 households, out of which 73.0% had children under the age of 18 living with them, 81.1% were married couples living together, 4.1% had a female householder with no husband present, and 14.8% were non-families. 13.1% of all households were made up of individuals, and 7.4% had someone living alone who was 65 years of age or older.  The average household size was 5.05 and the average family size was 5.73.

In the CDP, the population was spread out, with 58.0% under the age of 18, 12.0% from 18 to 24, 17.0% from 25 to 44, 9.6% from 45 to 64, and 3.4% who were 65 years of age or older.  The median age was 15 years. For every 100 females, there were 116.1 males.  For every 100 females age 18 and over, there were 108.9 males.

The median income for a household in the CDP was $26,964, and the median income for a family was $40,938. Males had a median income of $39,063 versus $16,875 for females. The per capita income for the CDP was $7,963.  About 29.5% of families and 33.8% of the population were below the poverty line, including 35.9% of those under age 18 and 22.2% of those age 65 or over.

References

Census-designated places in Alaska
Census-designated places in Kenai Peninsula Borough, Alaska
Populated coastal places in Alaska on the Pacific Ocean
Russian communities in the United States